Elections were held in the Australian state of Victoria on Saturday 29 April 1967 to elect the 73 members of the state's Legislative Assembly and 18 members of the 36-member Legislative Council.

Since the previous election, the number of Legislative Assembly electorates had been increased from 66 to 73, and the number of members in the Legislative Council had been increased from 34 to 35.

The incumbent Liberal Party government, led by Premier Henry Bolte, was returned for a fifth term.

Results

Legislative Assembly

|}

Legislative Council 

|}

Seats changing hands

 Members listed in italics did not recontest their seats.
 Lowan became a notional Country party seat in the redistribution before the election.

Post-election pendulum

See also
Candidates of the 1967 Victorian state election

References

Victorian state election 1967
Elections in Victoria (Australia)
Victorian state election 1967
Victorian state election 1967